Kanutia is a village in Mayureswar II block of Birbhum District in the Indian state of West Bengal.

References

Villages in Birbhum district